Henry Hubert Turner (August 28, 1892 – August 4, 1970) was an American endocrinologist, noted for his published description of Turner syndrome in 1938 at the annual meeting of the Association for the Study of Internal Secretions.  He served as chief of endocrinology and as associate dean of the University of Oklahoma College of Medicine.

Turner was born in Harrisburg, Illinois.  He received his medical education at the University of Louisville School of Medicine, graduating in 1921. He died in Oklahoma City, Oklahoma in 1970, 24 days before his 78th birthday.

References
 Turner HH. "A Syndrome of infantilism, congenital webbed neck, and cubitus valgus." Endocrinology 1938;23:566-574. 
 A Tribute to Henry H. Turner, M.D. (1892–1970): A Pioneer Endocrinologist. The Endocrinologist 14(4) 179–184, July–August 2004 G Bradley Schaefer, MD and Harris D. Riley Jr., MD
 

American endocrinologists
1892 births
1970 deaths
University of Louisville alumni